Kachagan may refer to:
 Arevatsag, Armenia
 Lernavan, Armenia